Valery Milagros Ortiz (born August 1, 1984) is a Puerto Rican actress and model. She has appeared in various television series including South of Nowhere (2005–2008), Diary of a Single Mom (2009–2011), Hit the Floor (2013–2016) and Gabby Duran & the Unsittables (2019–2021). Ortiz has also appeared in films including Date Movie (2006), Dumbbells (2014) and Thriller (2018).

Early life
Ortiz was born in San Juan, Puerto Rico and raised in Orlando, Florida. Passionate to become a "ballerina" and she explored her dancing talents after receiving a scholarship to The Southern Ballet Theater Performing Art Centre in Orlando.  She continued dancing but eased out of it in middle school as her interest in theatre and acting grew. She worked in Orlando as an extra on the Universal Studios backlot. Following in her older brother's footsteps, she was accepted into the Dr. Phillips High School performing arts magnet program. After four years of study, Ortiz began working in several productions like Latins Anonymous (Orlando Fringe Festival), West Side Story as Maria, A Midsummer Night's Dream as Helena, The Vagina Monologues (Orlando Premiere) and The Edinburgh, Scotland Fringe Festival.

Career
While attending the University of Central Florida for a Bachelor in Fine Arts, Ortiz was given an opportunity to work on television show Splat! as a host. After the first season, a two-week road trip "vacation" to Los Angeles turned into permanent relocation to Los Angeles. Ortiz quickly started working on a local television show called LATV Live as a VJ.

While working at the Hard Rock Cafe as a hostess, Ortiz was cast as in the comedy Date Movie as Jell-O, a Jennifer Lopez impersonation. During the movie's filming, she was cast the television series South of Nowhere. Shortly after, she was cast in the pilot Emily's Reason's Why Not, which was picked up and aired in 2006. In 2010, she appeared on an episode of Two and a Half Men. She currently is an anchor for Si TV and E! News. Ortiz was "One of the Top 25 Latinas of 2006" from Maxim en Español. For three seasons, Ortiz portrayed the role of Raquel Saldana in Hit the Floor, a scripted VH1 series that premiered May 2013.

In August 2019, Disney Channel announced the premiere date for their new live-action comedy series Gabby Duran and the Unsittables with Ortiz set to star as Dina Duran. Ahead of the series premiere in October 2019, the show received an early season 2 renewal from Disney Channel.

Personal life
Ortiz currently lives in Los Angeles, California. She enjoys reading, hiking, decorating, and writing.

Filmography

Film

Television

References

External links
Official website
South of Nowhere Cast Profile

  Valery Ortiz as Raquel Saldana on VH1's Hit the Floor (TV series)

1984 births
Living people
People from San Juan, Puerto Rico
Actresses from Orlando, Florida
21st-century Puerto Rican actresses
Puerto Rican film actresses
Puerto Rican television actresses
Puerto Rican dancers
Singers from Orlando, Florida
University of Central Florida alumni
Dr. Phillips High School alumni